Taiwanese Society of Child and Adolescent Psychiatry is a Taiwan-based union of child and adolescent psychiatrists founded in November 7, 1998 with the mission to promote the healthy development of children, adolescents, and families through advocacy, education, and research, and to assist members to meet the professional requirements of child and adolescent psychiatrists throughout their careers.

Duty
 Grant license to PGYs. 
 Offer health information to public. 
 Myth clarification. 
 Holding academic conference in a regular basis.

References

Child and adolescent psychiatry organizations
Child-related organizations in Taiwan